Berkshire County (pronounced ) is a county on the western edge of the U.S. state of Massachusetts. As of the 2020 census, the population was 129,026. Its largest city and traditional county seat is Pittsfield. The county was founded in 1761. The Berkshire Hills are centered on Berkshire County. Residents are known as Berkshirites. It exists today only as a historical geographic region, and has no county government, with the exception of the retirement board for former county workers, and certain offices such as the sheriff and registry of deeds.

Law and government
Of the fourteen Massachusetts counties, Berkshire County is one of eight that exists today only as a historical geographic region; it has limited county government. Berkshire County government was abolished effective July 1, 2000. Most former county functions were assumed by state agencies, and there is no county council or commission. The sheriff became a Commonwealth employee, but remains locally elected to perform duties within the county region and retains administrative and operational control over the Berkshire Sheriff's Office, an independent state agency created after the county government was abolished. The Berkshire Sheriff's Office runs the county jail and house of correction.

Local communities were granted the right to form their own regional compacts for sharing services, and the towns of Berkshire County have formed such a regional compact known as the Berkshire Regional Planning Commission.

Berkshire County has three Registry of Deeds Districts, one for each district.

 Berkshire Northern District in Adams contains records for the city of North Adams and the towns of Adams, Cheshire, Clarksburg, Florida, Hancock, Lanesborough, New Ashford, Savoy, Williamstown, and Windsor.
 Berkshire Middle District in Pittsfield contains records for the city of Pittsfield and the towns of Becket, Dalton, Hinsdale, Lee, Lenox, Otis, Peru, Richmond, Stockbridge, Tyringham and Washington.
 Berkshire Southern District in Great Barrington contains records for the towns of Alford, Egremont, Great Barrington, Monterey, Mount Washington, New Marlborough, Sandisfield, Sheffield and West Stockbridge.

Berkshire County has three districts and elected Representatives in the Massachusetts House of Representatives.

 First Berkshire. – Consisting of the towns of Adams, Cheshire, Clarksburg, Florida, Hancock, Hinsdale, Lanesborough, New Ashford, North Adams, Peru, Savoy, Williamstown, and Windsor, all in the county of Berkshire. John Barrett III(D) is the current Representative.
 Second Berkshire. – Consisting of the city of Pittsfield in the county of Berkshire. Tricia Farley-Bouvier (D) is the current Representative.
 Third Berkshire. – Consisting of the towns of Alford, Becket, Dalton, Egremont, Great Barrington, Lee, Lenox, Monterey, Mount Washington, New Marlborough, Otis, Richmond, Sandisfield, Sheffield, Stockbridge, Tyringham, Washington, and West Stockbridge, all in the county of Berkshire. William Smitty Pignatelli (D) is the current Representative.

Berkshire County comprises only part of one district for the Massachusetts Senate due to its low population. The district consists of all 32 cities and towns in Berkshire County as well as the following 25 communities: Ashfield, Buckland, Charlemont, Colrain, Conway, Hawley, Heath, Monroe, Shelburne, Rowe and Whately, in the county of Franklin; Blandford, Chester, Granville, Southwick, and Tolland in the county of Hampden; Chesterfield, Cummington, Goshen, Huntington, Middlefield, Plainfield, Westhampton, Williamsburg and Worthington, in the county of Hampshire. Paul Mark (D) is the current Senator.

The Massachusetts Governor's Council, also known as the Executive Council, is composed of eight individuals elected from districts, and the Lt. Governor who serves ex officio. The eight councillors are elected from their respective districts every two years. Berkshire County is part of the 8th District.

The Council generally meets at noon on Wednesdays in its State House Chamber, next to the Governor's Office, to act on issues such as payments from the state treasury, criminal pardons and commutations, and approval of gubernatorial appointments such as judges, notaries and justices of the peace.

See also the League of Women Voters of Massachusetts former page on counties (more detailed and with map) and its current page on counties (also useful).

Geography

It is the second-largest county in Massachusetts by land area. The highest natural point in Massachusetts, Mount Greylock at 3,492 feet (1,064 m), is in Berkshire County.

Berkshire County is one of two Massachusetts counties that borders three neighboring states (Vermont, New York and Connecticut); the other is  Worcester County. The two counties are also the only ones to touch both the northern and southern state lines.

Running north-south through the county are the Hoosac Range of the Berkshire Hills in the eastern part of the county and the Taconic Mountains in the western part of the county. Due to their elevation, the Berkshires attract tourists and summer residents eager to escape the heat of the lowlands.

Adjacent counties

 Bennington County, Vermont (north)
 Franklin County (northeast)
 Hampshire County (east)
 Hampden County (southeast)
 Litchfield County, Connecticut (south)
 Dutchess County, New York (southwest)
 Columbia County, New York (west)
 Rensselaer County, New York (northwest)

Demographics

2000 census
At the 2000 census there were 134,953 people, 56,006 households, and 35,115 families in the county. The population density was 145 people per square mile (56/km2). There were 66,301 housing units at an average density of 71 per square mile (27/km2). The county's racial makeup was 95.02% White, 1.99% Black or African American, 0.15% Native American, 0.99% Asian, 0.04% Pacific Islander, 0.59% from other races, and 1.23% from two or more races. 1.69%. were Hispanic or Latino of any race. 16.5% were of Italian, 16.4% Irish, 10.8% French, 10.3% English, 8.0% Polish, 7.1% German, 5.8% American and 5.1% French Canadian ancestry, 94.1% spoke English, 1.6% Spanish and 1.1% French as their first language.

Of the 56,006 households 27.50% had children under the age of 18 living with them, 48.00% were married couples living together, 11.00% had a female householder with no husband present, and 37.30% were non-families. 31.60% of households were one person and 13.90% were one person aged 65 or older. The average household size was 2.30 and the average family size was 2.89.

The age distribution was 22.40% under the age of 18, 8.40% from 18 to 24, 26.40% from 25 to 44, 24.90% from 45 to 64, and 17.90% 65 or older. The median age was 40 years. For every 100 females there were 91.70 males. For every 100 females age 18 and over, there were 88.10 males.

The county's median household income was $39,047, and the median family income was $50,162. Males had a median income of $36,692 versus $26,504 for females. The county's per capita income was $21,807. About 6.50% of families and 9.50% of the population were below the poverty line, including 12.30% of those under age 18 and 7.20% of those age 65 or over.

2010 census
At the 2010 census, there were 131,219 people, 56,091 households, and 33,618 families in the county. The racial makeup of the county was 92.5% white, 2.7% black or African American, 1.2% Asian, 0.2% American Indian, 1.2% from other races, and 2.1% from two or more races. Those of Hispanic or Latino origin made up 3.5% of the population. The largest ancestry groups were:

23.5% Irish
16.9% Italian
16.1% French
14.3% English
12.1% German
9.6% Polish
4.9% French Canadian
3.7% Scottish
3.0% American
2.0% Scotch-Irish
2.0% Russian
2.0% Dutch
1.5% Swedish
1.3% Portuguese
1.1% Puerto Rican

Of the 56,091 households, 25.9% had children under the age of 18 living with them, 43.9% were married couples living together, 11.5% had a female householder with no husband present, 40.1% were non-families, and 33.0% of households were made up of individuals. The average household size was 2.23 and the average family size was 2.82. The median age was 44.7 years.

The median household income was $48,907 and the median family income  was $64,783. Males had a median income of $47,401 versus $35,964 for females. The per capita income for the county was $28,300. About 7.9% of families and 11.6% of the population were below the poverty line, including 15.5% of those under age 18 and 7.3% of those age 65 or over.

Demographic breakdown by town

Income

The ranking of unincorporated communities included on the list are reflective if the census designated locations and villages were included as cities or towns. Data is from the 2007–2011 American Community Survey 5-Year Estimates.

Politics
In the 2016 and 2020 U.S. presidential elections, Berkshire County was Massachusetts's third-bluest county behind Suffolk County, which consists primarily of Boston, and Dukes County, home to Martha's Vineyard. In 2020, the county voted for Joe Biden by a 47.1% margin over Donald Trump, 72.4% to 25.3%.

|}

History 
The Mahican (Muh-he-ka-neew) Native American tribe lived in the area that now makes up Berkshire County until the early 18th century, when the first English settlers and frontiersmen appeared and began setting up farms and homesteads. On April 25, 1724, “The English finally paid the Indians 460 pounds, 3 barrels of cider, and 30 quarts of rum for what is today Berkshire County.” This deal did not include modern Sheffield, Stockbridge, Richmond, and Lenox, which were added later. Berkshire County was the western part of Hampshire County until separated in 1761.

In the 19th century, Berkshire County became popular with the American elite, which built what they called "cottages" throughout the countryside. The Gilded Age ended in the early 20th century with the income tax, World War I, and the Great Depression. In the 20th, century some of these cottages were torn or burned down, while others became prep schools, historic sites, or bed-and-breakfast inns.

Today Berkshire is known throughout the East Coast and the country as the summer home of the Boston Symphony Orchestra. It includes attractions such as Tanglewood, Berkshire Museum, the Norman Rockwell Museum, Mass MOCA, and Hancock Shaker Village.

Communities

Cities
 North Adams
 Pittsfield (county seat)

Towns

 Adams
 Alford
 Becket
 Cheshire
 Clarksburg
 Dalton
 Egremont
 Florida
 Great Barrington
 Hancock
 Hinsdale
 Lanesborough
 Lee
 Lenox
 Monterey
 Mount Washington
 New Ashford
 New Marlborough
 Otis
 Peru
 Richmond
 Sandisfield
 Savoy
 Sheffield
 Stockbridge
 Tyringham
 Washington
 West Stockbridge
 Williamstown
 Windsor

Census-designated places

 Adams
 Cheshire
 Great Barrington
 Housatonic
 Lee
 Lenox
 Williamstown

Transportation
County-wide bus service is provided by the Berkshire Regional Transit Authority. Amtrak train service and Peter Pan intercity bus service is provided at Pittsfield.

Airports
 Harriman-and-West Airport
 Pittsfield Municipal Airport (Massachusetts)
 Walter J. Koladza Airport

Major Highways

Notable residents 
 Scholar and civil rights activist W.E.B. Du Bois was born in Great Barrington, MA. His birthplace and other sites of interest are part of the Upper Housatonic Valley African American Heritage Trail.
 Folk singer Arlo Guthrie resides in Berkshire County.
 Author Nathaniel Hawthorne resided at the "Little Red House" in Lenox, MA near the grounds of the Tanglewood Music Festival, where he wrote The House of Seven Gables and other novels.
 Author Herman Melville resided at Arrowhead in Pittsfield, MA, where he wrote the novel Moby Dick.
 Artist Norman Rockwell resided in Stockbridge, MA.
 Singer-songwriter and guitarist James Taylor resides in Berkshire County.
 Author Edith Wharton kept a home in Lenox, MA.
 Actor Mark Wahlberg often spends time Berkshire County has a residence in Pittsfield, MA.
 Actress Elizabeth Banks is from Pittsfield, MA. and often comes back and visits.
 Actress Karen Allen lives in Monterey.
 Cellist Yo-Yo Ma has a home in Tyringham.

Economy
This county is the highest milk producer in the state.

See also
 List of Massachusetts locations by per capita income
 Registry of Deeds (Massachusetts)
 National Register of Historic Places listings in Berkshire County, Massachusetts
 USS Berkshire County (LST-288)
List of counties in Massachusetts

References

External links

 Berkshires.org (Berkshires vacation site)
 iBerkshires.com (news web site)
 Wall & Gray. 1871 Atlas of Massachusetts. Map of Massachusetts. USA. New England. Counties – Berkshire, Franklin, Hampshire and Hampden, Worcester, Middlesex, Essex and Norfolk, Boston – Suffolk, Plymouth, Bristol, Barnstable and Dukes (Cape Cod). Cities – Springfield, Worcester, Lowell, Lawrence, Haverhill, Newburyport, Salem, Lynn, Taunton, Fall River. New Bedford. These 1871 maps of the Counties and Cities are useful to see the roads and rail lines.
 Beers, D.G. 1872 Atlas of Essex County Map of Massachusetts Plate 5.  Click on the map for a large image. Also see detailed map of 1872 Essex County Plate 7.
 Berkshire County Sheriff's Office

 
Massachusetts counties
1761 establishments in Massachusetts
Populated places established in 1761
2000 disestablishments in Massachusetts
Populated places disestablished in 2000